Ross Brown may refer to:

 Ross Brown (rugby union) (1934–2014), New Zealand rugby union player
 Ross Brown (rower) (born 1981), Australian rower
 Ross Brown (politician), Green politician in Northern Ireland

See also
 Claire Ross-Brown (born 1972), English actress